The 2018 season is Ceres–Negros Football Club's 7th in existence and the club's 2nd season in the top flight of Philippine football. Ceres competed in the Philippines Football League, Copa Paulino Alcantara, and AFC Cup. It covers a period from January 16 to September 22, 2018.

They made their first appearance in the AFC Champions League qualifying playoff winning over Burmese club Shan United and securing an upset victory against Australian side Brisbane Roar. They failed to progress to the tournament proper after they were knocked off by Chinese club Tianjin Quanjian.

Players

Squad information

Competitions

Overview

Philippines Football League

Standings

Results summary

Results by round

Matches

Note:
 a  Due to the unavailability of Marikina Sports Complex, the match will be played in neutral venue Rizal Memorial Stadium.
 b  Due to the bad condition of the pitch in the Cebu City Sports Complex, the match will be played in neutral venue Rizal Memorial Stadium.
 c  JPV Marikina FC was not able to mobilize adequate security personnel for the match. As a result, it was played without spectators.
 d  Due to the unavailability of Davao del Norte Sports Complex, the match will be played in neutral venue Rizal Memorial Stadium.
 e  Due to the unavailability of Marikina Sports Complex, the match will be played in neutral venue Biñan Football Stadium.
 f  Due to the unavailability of Panaad Stadium, the match will be played in neutral venue Rizal Memorial Stadium.
 g  Originally schedule on 15 August but the match was abandoned by Global Cebu. Ceres–Negros won 3–0 by default.

Copa Paulino Alcantara

Group stage 

Note:
 a  Due to the unavailability of Panaad Stadium, the match will be played in neutral venue Rizal Memorial Stadium.
 b  Due to the unavailability of Biñan Football Stadium, the match will be played in neutral venue Rizal Memorial Stadium.
 c  Due to the unavailability of Davao del Norte Sports Complex, the match will be played in neutral venue Rizal Memorial Stadium.

AFC Champions League

Ceres–Negros made their first appearance in the AFC Champions League qualifying play-offs by virtue of being the champions of the 2017 Philippines Football League season.

Qualifying play-offs

Ceres–Negros started their AFC Champions League qualifying play-offs with a match against Burmese side, Shan United. Prior to the match, Ceres-Negros only had three training sessions. Ceres-Negros won over Shan United on penalties.

They went on to face Australian club Brisbane Roar which was at that time had already played 17 games of the 2017-18 A-League season and was ranked 7th in the league table. For about five minutes in the second half, Brisbane player Eric Bauteac had to be pulled off the pitch after his kit number peeled off. He was allowed to return to the pitch after the numbers were fixed. Ceres-Negros won 3–2 over Brisbane Roar a result which was considered as an upset leading to calls for the resignation of the Australian side's coach John Aloisi.

Ceres-Negros had to deal with visa issues prior to their match against Tianjin Quanjian in China. The club appealed to the Asian Football Confederation to delay the match so the clubs may be "on equal footing" and make consideration on the basis the Ceres' players are "coming from another continent" but such request was not granted. The club only had their Chinese visas for their players processed in the afternoon of January 29, the day prior to match day, and left for Tianjin on the same day. Ceres-Negros ended their campaign after they conceded two goals in their match against Tianjin Quanjian though their efforts were praised by PFF President Mariano Araneta. Ceres coach Risto Vidakovic was also satisfied with his players' performance.

AFC Cup

Having been knockout by Tianjin Quanjian in the 2018 AFC Champions League qualifying playoff, Ceres-Negros relegates to the 2018 AFC Cup group stage where they are grouped with three other Southeast Asian teams.

Ceres-Negros ended their home match against Boeung Ket Angkor of Cambodia with a 9–0 win. This equaled the 9–0 win of Uzbek club Nasaf Qarshi over Indian club Dempo in 2011 as the match with the biggest score margin in the AFC Cup.

Group stage

Knockout stage

ASEAN Zonal Semifinal

Ceres–Negros won 6–5 on aggregate.

ASEAN Zonal Final

Home United won 3–1 on aggregate.

Transfers

In

Out

References

External links

Ceres–Negros F.C. seasons
Ceres-Negros 2018
Ceres-Negros 2018